George William McComas (1841 – October 4, 1928) was an American politician from Maryland. He served as a member of the Maryland House of Delegates, representing Harford County, from 1902 to 1905.

Early life
George William McComas was born in Harford County, Maryland, in 1841, to Keziah and Henry G. McComas. His great-uncle Henry C. McComas fought and died in the defense of Baltimore in 1812. He was educated at Newton Academy in Baltimore.

Career
McComas was a farmer and canner of farm products.

McComas served as a member of the Maryland House of Delegates, representing Harford County, from 1902 to 1905.

Personal life
McComas married Nellie Norris Kindley of Monrovia, Maryland, on November 23, 1907. They lived in Singer, Maryland. He married Virginia Norris.

McComas died on October 4, 1928, at his home in Singer. He was buried at Union Chapel Cemetery in Overlea.

References

Date of birth unknown
1841 births
1928 deaths
People from Harford County, Maryland
Democratic Party members of the Maryland House of Delegates
Farmers from Maryland